The Haunted School is an Australian television series which screened in 1986 on the ABC. It was based on the novel of the same by Carol Drinkwater, who also starred in the lead role.

The series was produced by Ray Alchin, written by Helen Cresswell and directed by Frank Arnold.

Cast
 Carol Drinkwater as Fanny Crowe
 Grant Navin as Richard Blackburn
 Michael Beecher as Henry Blackburn
 James Laurie as Joseph McCormack
 Emil Minty as Patrick McCormick
 Beth Buchanan as Vanessa
 Mouche Phillips as Magpie
 Leigh Nicholls as Clarissa
 Mervyn Drake as Charlie Boyd
 Harry Lawrence as Jeremiah
 Jennifer West as Mrs. Tippery
 Lynne Porteous as Lil Boyd
 Duncan Wass as Reverend Dalton

See also 
 List of Australian television series

References

External links
 
 The Haunted School at the Australian Television Information Archive

1986 Australian television series debuts
Australian Broadcasting Corporation original programming